The Communauté de communes Somme-Sud-Ouest is a communauté de communes in the Somme département and in the Hauts-de-France région of France. It was formed on 1 January 2017 by the merger of the former Communauté de communes du Contynois, the Communauté de communes de la Région d'Oisemont and the Communauté de communes du Sud-Ouest Amiénois. It consists of 119 communes, and its seat is in Poix-de-Picardie. Its area is 909.2 km2, and its population was 38,575 in 2019.

Composition
The communauté de communes consists of the following 119 communes:

Airaines
Allery
Andainville
Arguel
Aumâtre
Aumont
Avelesges
Avesnes-Chaussoy
Bacouel-sur-Selle
Beaucamps-le-Jeune
Beaucamps-le-Vieux
Belleuse
Belloy-Saint-Léonard
Bergicourt
Bermesnil
Bettembos
Blangy-sous-Poix
Bosquel
Bougainville
Brassy
Briquemesnil-Floxicourt
Brocourt
Bussy-lès-Poix
Camps-en-Amiénois
Cannessières
Caulières
Cerisy-Buleux
Contre
Conty
Courcelles-sous-Moyencourt
Courcelles-sous-Thoix
Croixrault
Dromesnil
Épaumesnil
Éplessier
Équennes-Éramecourt
Essertaux
Étréjust
Famechon
Fleury
Fluy
Fontaine-le-Sec
Forceville-en-Vimeu
Fossemanant
Foucaucourt-Hors-Nesle
Fourcigny
Framicourt
Frémontiers
Fresnes-Tilloloy
Fresneville
Fresnoy-Andainville
Fresnoy-au-Val
Frettecuisse
Fricamps
Gauville
Guizancourt
Hescamps
Heucourt-Croquoison
Hornoy-le-Bourg
Inval-Boiron
Lachapelle
Lafresguimont-Saint-Martin
Laleu
Lamaronde
Lignières-Châtelain
Lignières-en-Vimeu
Liomer
Marlers
Le Mazis
Meigneux
Méréaucourt
Méricourt-en-Vimeu
Métigny
Molliens-Dreuil
Monsures
Montagne-Fayel
Morvillers-Saint-Saturnin
Mouflières
Moyencourt-lès-Poix
Namps-Maisnil
Nampty
Nesle-l'Hôpital
Neslette
Neuville-au-Bois
Neuville-Coppegueule
Ô-de-Selle
Offignies
Oisemont
Oissy
Oresmaux
Plachy-Buyon
Poix-de-Picardie
Prouzel
Le Quesne
Quesnoy-sur-Airaines
Quevauvillers
Rambures
Riencourt
Saint-Aubin-Montenoy
Saint-Aubin-Rivière
Sainte-Segrée
Saint-Germain-sur-Bresle
Saint-Léger-sur-Bresle
Saint-Maulvis
Saulchoy-sous-Poix
Senarpont
Sentelie
Tailly
Thieulloy-l'Abbaye
Thieulloy-la-Ville
Thoix
Le Translay
Velennes
Vergies
Villeroy
Villers-Campsart
Vraignes-lès-Hornoy
Warlus
Woirel

References

Somme-Sud-Ouest
Somme-Sud-Ouest